Kim Book (born 12 February 1946 in Bath) is an English former professional footballer who played as a goalkeeper for Bournemouth & Boscombe Athletic, Northampton Town, Mansfield Town and Doncaster Rovers (84 league games).

He is best known for being in goal for Northampton when George Best scored six goals for Manchester United in a FA Cup game on 7 February 1970.

He signed in 1967 and played until 1973. His brother Tony Book and son Steve Book also played football.

In the 1975 season he took over as manager at Weston-super-Mare A.F.C.

References

Living people
1946 births
Sportspeople from Bath, Somerset
English footballers
Association football goalkeepers
Gloucester City A.F.C. players
Mansfield Town F.C. players
Northampton Town F.C. players
Doncaster Rovers F.C. players